Bhupinder Nath Kirpal (B. N. Kirpal) (born 8 November 1937) was the 31st Chief Justice of India, serving from 6 May 2002 until his retirement on 7 November 2002.

He is an alumnus of The Modern School, New Delhi and St Stephens College, Delhi University. A top cricketer, he represented both his school and college.

He began his legal career as an advocate in 1962 and was appointed a Judge of Delhi High Court in November 1979. In December 1993, he was appointed Chief Justice of the Gujarat High Court.

In September 1995, he was appointed Judge of the Supreme Court of India and became Chief Justice of India in May 2002.

After retirement as the Chief Justice of India, he was appointed the 1st Chairman of the National Forest Commission on 21 February 2003.

Personal life 
He was born in Lahore but shifted to Delhi after partition. He is married to Aruna Kirpal (née Sachdev) and has three children. His son, Mr. Saurabh Kirpal, Senior Advocate of the Hon'ble Delhi High Court, was on 11 November 2021 approved by the collegium of the Hon'ble Supreme Court of India to be elevated as a Judge of the Delhi High Court.

References

External links
 Brief biography at http://supremecourtofindia.nic.in/
 News article dated 13-April-2002 

Chief justices of India
1937 births
Living people
Judges of the Delhi High Court
20th-century Indian judges
Judges of the Gujarat High Court
People from Lahore
20th-century Indian lawyers
21st-century Indian lawyers
21st-century Indian judges
Modern School (New Delhi) alumni